The Journal of Statistical Physics is a biweekly publication containing both original and review papers, including book reviews. All areas of statistical physics as well as related fields concerned with collective phenomena in physical systems are covered. The Journal of Statistical Physics has an impact factor of 1.243 (2019).

The journal was established by Howard Reiss.  Joel L. Lebowitz is the honorary editor.

In the period 1969-1979 the journal published about 65 articles per year, while in the 1980-2016 period approximately 220 articles per year. In total, as to 2017, more than 9000 articles have appeared on this journal. According to Web of Science as of July 2017 the 10 most cited articles which have appeared on this journal are:

 Tsallis, C, Possible generalization of Boltzmann-Gibbs statistics, J. Stat. Phys., vol. 52(1-2), 479-487, (1988). Times Cited: 4,245 
 Feigenbaum, MJ, Quantitative universality for a class of non-linear transformations, J. Stat. Phys., vol. 19(1), 25-52, (1978). Times Cited: 2,230 
 Sauer, T; Yorke, JA; Casdagli, M, Embedology, J. Stat. Phys., vol. 65(3-4), 579-616, (1991). Times Cited: 1,319 
 Wertheim, MS, Fluids with highly directional attractive forces. 1. Statistical thermodynamics, J. Stat. Phys., vol. 35(1-2), 19-34, (1984). Times Cited: 1,232 
 Wertheim, MS, Fluids with highly directional attractive forces. 3. Multiple attraction sites, J. Stat. Phys., vol. 42(3-4), 459-476, (1986). Times Cited: 1,109 
 Feigenbaum, MJ, Universal metric properties of non-linear transformations, J. Stat. Phys., vol. 21(6), 669-706, (1979). Times Cited: 1,071 
 Wertheim, MS, Fluids with highly directional attractive forces. 2. Thermodynamic perturbation-theory and integral-equations, J. Stat. Phys., vol. 35(1-2), 35-47, (1984). Times Cited: 1,051 
 Wertheim, MS, Fluids with highly directional attractive forces. 4. equilibrium polymerization, J. Stat. Phys., vol. 42(3-4), 477-492, (1986). Times Cited: 984 
 Voorhees, PW, The theory of Ostwald Ripening, J. Stat. Phys., vol. 38(1-2), 231-252, (1985). Times Cited: 820 
 Kirkpatrick, S, Optimization by simulated annealing - Quantitative studies, J. Stat. Phys., vol. 34(5-6), 975-986, (1984). Times Cited: 809

Abstracting and indexing 
The journal is abstracted and indexed in: Astrophysics Data System, Chemical Abstracts Service, Science Citation Index, Scopus, and Zentralblatt MATH.

References 

English-language journals
Physics journals
Publications established in 1975
Statistics journals
Springer Science+Business Media academic journals
Semi-monthly journals